Bassinthedust is an Australian music festival. It is the second largest music festival in the Northern Territory, and has been held annually since 2004 in Alice Springs. The festival is an offshoot of Bassinthegrass and is operated by the Northern Territory Government through the Northern Territory Major Events Company, part of a project of the previous Martin government to bring prominent bands to the territory and showcase local talent. Bassinthedust has grown rapidly since its inception. It is a sister festival of Bassinthegrass, replacing an Alice Springs leg of Bassinthegrass which had been held at the first festival in 2003.

History

Bassinthegrass was first held in 2003, to fulfill a campaign promise by the Martin government to hold a Big Day Out-style youth concert in the territory. It was held in both Darwin and Alice Springs in its inaugural year, with the Alice Springs leg later becoming the Bassinthedust festival. 5000 people attended the Darwin leg, with a further 1500 in Alice Springs, listening to headline acts The Living End, 30 Odd Foot of Grunts, and NoKTuRNL. It was widely hailed as a success in the territory media, and became an annual event.

The Alice-only Bassinthedust festival was first held in 2004 at the Memo Club on 11 September 2004 to an audience of around 1200. The 2005 festival, featuring Spiderbait, Frenzal Rhomb, The Flairz, Screaming Jets, and Dallas Crane, was held at Anzac Oval (where all but the first festival have been held) on Saturday 10 September. The 2006 festival, featuring End of Fashion, Pete Murray and The Living End, was held on Saturday 23 September with an audience of around 2300. Hilltop Hoods were meant to play but were unable to make it to Alice Springs for the show. They later put on a show to make up for missing the festival. Jet headlined the 2007 festival on Saturday 22 September.

Bassinthedust 2008 will be held on 4 October at Anzac Oval.

Artist line-up by year

2008

Paul Kelly
Jebediah
The Getaway Plan
Bliss n Eso
Kid Kenobi and MC Shureshock
Local NT Acts:
Miazma
Unbroken Expanse
Glasgow Smile

2007

Jet
The Waifs 
TZU
Lowrider 
Behind Crimson Eyes
Mammal
Exit Earth 
Bloom 
Tara Stewart 
Nights Plague 
Through Bullets and Bravery

2006

End of Fashion 
Pete Murray
The Living End
Blistered 
Nights Plague 
Sweet Surrender 
Zenith ASP
The Moxie 
Eternal Crusaders

2005

Spiderbait
Frenzal Rhomb
The Flairz
Screaming Jets
Dallas Crane
Letterstick Band
Tashka Urban
Exit Earth
Zenith ASP
Robotik Coq
Teknikal Onslaught
Super Raelene Bros
Wild Weekend's Samah n Grab 
RnB  DJ Lenno and MC Jaz

2004

The Superjesus 
Hilltop Hoods 
Christine Anu 
Resin Dogs 
TZU
C-Kalibration 
Tecoma 
Blacktide 
Cinco Locos

References

External links
 Official BASSINTHEDUST site

Festivals in the Northern Territory
Music festivals established in 2004
Recurring events established in 2004
Music festivals in Australia
Alice Springs